James Adam Brown (born 3 March 1983) is a Canadian actor.

Background 
J. Adam is a graduate of Ryerson University in Toronto, Ontario. He is best known for his role in the return episode of the cult classic TV series Are You Afraid of the Dark?.

Filmography

Film

Television

References

External links
 

1983 births
Living people
Canadian male film actors
Canadian male television actors
Canadian male voice actors
Toronto Metropolitan University alumni